Busan station is a train station in Busan, South Korea. It is the southern terminus of the Gyeongbu Line & the Gyeongbu high-speed railway, the most important railway lines in the country, which links Busan with Seoul in just under three hours on KTX, Korea's high-speed rail train.  It is also an underground station on Busan Metro Line 1 between Jungang and Choryang stations. The station is centrally located in the Choryang-dong (neighbourhood) of Dong-gu (ward) in Busan.

Construction of the new KTX Busan terminal began in 2001 and was completed in 2003. The new station covers 24,646 square meters/265,287 square feet and it is equipped with up-to-date automatic ticket vending machines, 11 elevators, 10 escalators, PC area, waiting and vending areas.

The entire convex curved front of the structure is glass covered construction and the station is considered an architecturally significant building.

The main entrance opens up to a large park-like area surrounding the front of the station to the west.

Platforms 

Busan station of Busan Metro has two side platforms serving two tracks.

Platforms 

 Platform numbers are not assigned.

See also
 Transportation in South Korea

References

External links 

 Korail Busan website 
 KTX & other Trains: Busan Metropolitan Government
 Metro of busan - busan official site
 Cyber station information from Busan Transportation Corporation

Railway stations in Busan
Busan Metro stations
Dong District, Busan
Railway stations opened in 1908
Korea Train Express stations
1908 establishments in Korea